Acentrella is a genus of small minnow mayflies in the family Baetidae. There are at least 20 described species in Acentrella.

Species
These 26 species belong to the genus Acentrella:

 Acentrella alachua (Berner, 1940) i c g
 Acentrella almohades Alba-Tercedor & El-Alami, 1999 c g
 Acentrella barbarae Jacobus and McCafferty, 2006 i c g
 Acentrella chantauensis (Kluge, 1981) c g
 Acentrella charadra Sroka & Arnekleiv, 2010 c g
 Acentrella diptera Kluge & Novikova, 2011 c g
 Acentrella feminalis (Eaton, 1885) c g
 Acentrella fenestrata (Kazlauskas, 1963) i c g
 Acentrella feropagus Alba-Tercedor and McCafferty, 2000 i c g
 Acentrella glareosa Sroka & Arnekleiv, 2010 c g
 Acentrella gnom (Kluge, 1983) c g
 Acentrella hyaloptera (Bogoescu, 1951) c g
 Acentrella inexpectata (Tshernova, 1928) i c g
 Acentrella insignificans (McDunnough, 1926) i c g b
 Acentrella joosti (Zimmermann & Braasch, 1979) c g
 Acentrella lapponica Bengtsson, 1912 i c g
 Acentrella lata (Müller-Liebenau, 1985) c g
 Acentrella nadineae McCafferty, Waltz & Webb, 2009 i c g b
 Acentrella parvula (McDunnough, 1932) i c g
 Acentrella rallatoma Burian & Myers, 2011 c g
 Acentrella scabriventris Kluge & Novikova, 2011 c g
 Acentrella sibirica (Kazlauskas, 1963) c g
 Acentrella sinaica Bogoescu, 1931 c g
 Acentrella suzukiella Matsumura, 1931 c g
 Acentrella tonneri (Braasch & Soldán, 1983) c
 Acentrella turbida (McDunnough, 1924) i c g b

Data sources: i = ITIS, c = Catalogue of Life, g = GBIF, b = Bugguide.net

References

External links

 

Mayfly genera
Mayflies